The 1913 Rock Island Independents season was the team's sixth season in existence. The season resulted in the team posting an undefeated 6-0-1 record and claimed the mythical "Illinois State Championship".

Schedule

References

Rock Island Independents seasons
Rock Island
Rock Island